Alejandro Marañón Pérez (born 15 May 1980) is a Spanish retired footballer who played mainly as a left back.

Club career
Born in Cartaya, Province of Huelva, Marañón arrived at Sevilla FC at the age of 21, going on to spend two full seasons with their reserves. On 23 November 2003 he made his first appearance for the first team, playing the entire 0–1 away loss against RCD Espanyol; he took part in another five La Liga matches, notably a 1–5 defeat at Real Madrid.

In July 2004, Marañón joined Real Murcia, being an important defensive unit in his first two seasons, spent in Segunda División. However, he featured little as the club returned to the top level in 2007 and even less in the following campaign, being released in July 2009.

References

External links

1980 births
Living people
Sportspeople from the Province of Huelva
Spanish footballers
Footballers from Andalusia
Association football defenders
La Liga players
Segunda División players
Segunda División B players
Tercera División players
RCD Mallorca B players
RCD Mallorca players
Sevilla Atlético players
Sevilla FC players
Real Murcia players